Following is a list of all Article III United States federal judges appointed by President Martin Van Buren during his presidency. In total Van Buren appointed 11 Article III federal judges, including 3 Justices to the Supreme Court of the United States and 8 judges to the United States district courts.

John Catron was nominated to the United States Supreme Court by President Andrew Jackson on the final day of his presidency, March 3, 1837. The United States Senate confirmed the nomination on March 8, 1837 and President Van Buren issued his commission, and thus appointed him, the same day.

United States Supreme Court justices

District courts

Notes

References
General

 

Specific

Sources
 Federal Judicial Center

Van Buren